Pobuma Rural LLG is a local-level government (LLG) of Manus Province, Papua New Guinea.

Wards
01. M'buke/Whal
02. Bundrahei/Sabondralis
03. Likum
04. Babun
05. Butjou
06. Timoenai
07. Pohowadeyaha
08. Jekal
09. Peli Patu

References

Local-level governments of Manus Province